Canoe Lake is a lake in north-western Canadian province of Saskatchewan.
Settlements on the lake include Canoe Narrows, Cole Bay, Jans Bay.  
The lake is accessed by Hwy 965 and Hwy 903.

To the west of the lake is the Primrose Lake Air Weapons Range. The Canoe River flows east from the lake to Lac Île-à-la-Crosse.

See also 
List of lakes of Saskatchewan

References 

Division No. 18, Unorganized, Saskatchewan
Lakes of Saskatchewan
Hudson's Bay Company trading posts